Philopedon plagiatum is a species of weevil native to Europe.

References

External links
Images representing Philopedon at BOLD

Curculionidae
Beetles described in 1783
Beetles of Europe